Gracián is a Spanish surname. Notable people with the surname include:

Baltasar Gracián (1601–1658), Spanish writer and philosopher
Jerónimo Gracián
Leandro Gracián (born 1982), Argentine footballer

Spanish-language surnames